Bankura Christian Collegiate School is situated in Bankura town, West Bengal, India. It is one of the oldest schools of the district. It is also known as Mission Boys School. It was established in 1889. The boys-only school has more than 1800 students. The school is affiliated by WBBSE. The boys from 5th to 12th standard are taught here. The school has a boys' hostel in its campus. It has a football ground.

References

Facebook Page https://www.facebook.com/bccsbankura/

External links
 Bankura Christian collegiate details 
 Bankura Christian collegiate school information

Boys' schools in India
High schools and secondary schools in West Bengal
Schools in Bankura district
Educational institutions established in 1889
1889 establishments in British India